John Sharpe (born 18 May 1939) is an Australian born Canadian former professional tennis player.

Born in Melbourne, Sharpe featured in the main draw of all four grand slam tournaments while touring as an Australian in the early 1960s. His best performance came at the 1961 U.S. National Championships, where he made it through to the fourth round.

Sharpe studied in the United States at Pan American College, Texas and was a member of their collegiate tennis team. Around 1965 he moved to Toronto for work and in 1968 became eligible to play for his adoptive country. During this period he was also studying to be a stockbroker and was largely absent from the international tour.

In 1969 he began touring again as a member of the Canada Davis Cup team, appearing in a total of five ties in three years. This includes a 3-2 win over New Zealand in 1970 to qualify Canada for the Americas Inter-Zonal Final, with his singles win over Onny Parun as well as his doubles victory against Parun and Brian Fairlie important to the final outcome.

See also
List of Canada Davis Cup team representatives

References

External links
  (wrong birthdate)
 
 

1939 births
Living people
Australian male tennis players
Canadian male tennis players
Australian emigrants to Canada
University of Texas–Pan American alumni
College men's tennis players in the United States